The National Comedy Theatre is an improvisational comedy company based in San Diego, CA.

The theatre opened in 1999 at the former Marquis Theatre in the Mission Hills area of San Diego, and has performed over 6000 shows as of 2023, making it the longest running show in the history of the city.

In 2017, the company spun off a non-profit organization, Unscripted Learning, which uses the concepts of improvised theatre to teach social and communication skills to individuals on the autism spectrum. The organization also teaches classes for senior citizens. 

Additionally, the National Comedy Theatre teaches corporate workshops through its WITS Teambuilding program, which uses improvisational techniques to teach collaborative thinking and teamwork.

References

External links
National Comedy Theatre, San Diego - official site
Unscripted Learning
WITS Team Building

Theatrical organizations in the United States
Improvisational theatre
Comedy clubs in the United States
Performing groups established in 2000
Culture of San Diego
Tourist attractions in San Diego